Francis Laurens Vinton (1835–1879) served in the Union Amy during the American Civil War. As colonel he commanded the 3rd Brigade of Howe's division at the Battle of Fredericksburg, and was very badly wounded. He never saw active service again, but in 1863 he was appointed brigadier general.

References

Sources 
 Warner, Ezra J. (1964). "Francis Laurens Vinton". Generals in Blue: Lives of the Union Commanders. Baton Rouge: Louisiana State University Press. pp. 528–529.

External links 
 "Francis Laurens Vinton". Find a Grave. October 27, 2001. Retrieved March 17, 2023.
 "Vinton, Francis L. (Francis Laurens), 1835–1879". The Online Books Page. Retrieved March 17, 2023.

1835 births
1879 deaths
Union Army generals